The 1980–81 FIBA European Cup Winners' Cup was the fifteenth edition of FIBA's 2nd-tier level European-wide professional club basketball competition, contested between national domestic cup champions, running from 7 October 1980, to 18 March 1981. It was contested by 20 teams, two less than in the previous edition.

Squibb Cantù defeated FC Barcelona, in the final held in Rome, winning the FIBA European Cup Winner's Cup for a (European record) fourth time.

Participants

First round

|}

*Union Récréation Alexandria withdrew before the second leg and Moderne received a forfeit (2-0).

Second round

|}

Automatically qualified to the Quarter finals group stage
 Turisanda Varese (title holder)
 Squibb Cantù
 FC Barcelona

Quarterfinals

Semifinals

|}

Final
March 18, Palaeur, Rome

|}

References

External links 
FIBA European Cup Winner's Cup 1980–81 linguasport.com
FIBA European Cup Winner's Cup 1980–81

FIBA
FIBA Saporta Cup